Craig Walker may refer to:

 Craig Walker (writer) (born 1960), Canadian writer, theatre director, actor and educator
Craig F. Walker, American photojournalist